Anixia myriasca is a species of fungus that belongs to the Anixia genus. It was documented in 1902 by Austrian mycologist Franz Xaver Rudolf von Höhnel.

References 

Agaricomycetes
Fungi described in 1902